uBid.com was an online auction style and fixed-price shopping website offering goods sold directly by the company and items sold by pre-approved third party uBid-certified merchants. The site specialized in excess new, refurbished and overstock consumer electronics such as computers, electronics, home goods, jewelry, watches and cellular phones.

History
uBid.com was formed and launched in 1997, originally as a subsidiary of PC Mall. In December 1998, during the dot-com bubble, the company became a public company via an initial public offering, and achieved a market capitalization value of over 1.8 billion dollars at one point. After pricing at $15/share, the stock price reached $67 per share on its first day of trading. The company officially spun off from PC Mall with its co-founding management team in 1999. Ownership has changed multiple times over the years. In 2000, CMGI (now Steel Connect) acquired uBid in a stock transaction. In June 2001, the company reached an agreement to feature its listings on Yahoo! Auctions. In November 2002, the company laid off 52 employees. In 2003, CMGI sold uBid to Takumi Interactive, owned by Tom Petters and Petters Group Worldwide. In 2006, the company acquired the assets of Bidville.com.

In 2010 the company underwent an involuntary bankruptcy petition. In October 2018, the company merged with Incumaker and in February 2019, the company changed its name to uBid Holdings, Inc. In 2020, the company began rebranding itself as a restaurant and entertainment digital coupon company after purchasing Restaurant.com and was renamed to RDE, Inc. As of 2022, the uBid website had been taken offline.

Notes

External links
uBid.com (Dead link)

Online auction websites of the United States
American companies established in 1997
Retail companies established in 1997
Internet properties established in 1997
Companies based in Chicago